Luzhniki Palace of Sports, formerly the Palace of Sports of the Central Lenin Stadium, is a sports arena in Moscow, Russia, a part of the Luzhniki Olympic Complex. Built in 1956, it originally had a spectator capacity of 13,700. In the past it was the host site of the world and European championships in ice hockey, gymnastics, volleyball, basketball, boxing, skateboarding and other sports.

It hosted several games during the 1972 Summit Series tournament between the Soviet Union and Canada and was a venue for gymnastics and judo events at the 1980 Summer Olympics.

In 2002, the arena experienced a major reconstruction and the seating capacity was lowered to 11,500. The arena subsequently hosted the 2005 World Figure Skating Championships. It was primarily used for ice hockey as the home arena for HC Dynamo Moscow until the year 2000, in which the club moved to Luzhniki Small Sports Arena.

Notable sporting events
 1956, 1959, 1963, 1967, 1971, and 1979 Spartakiad of the Peoples of the USSR
 EuroBasket 1965
 1957, 1973, 1979, and 1986 Ice Hockey World Championships
 1959 FIBA World Championship for Women
 1986 Goodwill Games
 1962 men's and women's Volleyball World Championships
 Games 5–8 of the 1972 Canada-USSR ice hockey Summit Series
 Games 5–8 of the 1974 series against Canada
 2001 UEFA Futsal Championship
 2005 World Figure Skating Championships

Notable concerts
 Big Country – 1988
 Cannibal Corpse – 1993
 Scorpions – 1997
 Scooter – 2000
 Rammstein – 2001
 Judas Priest - 2005
 Kraftwerk – 2004
 Depeche Mode & The Bravery – 2006
 Muse – 2007
 Dream Theater, Nightwish – 2009
 Smokie – 2011

See also
Luzhniki Olympic Complex

References

External links

 Official website

Sports venues completed in 1956
Indoor arenas built in the Soviet Union
Indoor arenas in Russia
Music venues in Russia
Indoor ice hockey venues in Russia
Sports venues in Moscow
Sports Palace
Olympic gymnastics venues
Olympic judo venues
Khamovniki District
Sports venue